Guillermo Eduardo Clemens Antelo (born 26 November 1988) is a Mexican footballer who plays as forward for Cafetaleros de Tapachula.

References

External links

Guillermo Clemens at Lobos BUAP Profile

1988 births
Living people
People from Navojoa
Footballers from Sonora
Association football forwards
Club Celaya footballers
Atlético San Luis footballers
Correcaminos UAT footballers
Lobos BUAP footballers
Mexican footballers